SC Berliner Amateure is a German association football club from the city of Berlin.

History
The club was established 20 June 1920. It was joined by Sportverein Gustav Cords Berlin in 1926 and then by Sportverein Deutsche Krankenversichrungs AG Berlin in 1933. The club was lost in the aftermath of World War II with the membership becoming part of Sportgemeinde Kreuzberg before it was reestablished on 1 August 1949.

Amateure has generally played as an anonymous local side throughout its existence. They made an appearance in the 1925 quarterfinal of the Berliner Pokal (Berlin Cup) where they put out by 3–0 1. FC Neukölln. From 1968–71 the team was part of the Amateurliga Berlin (III). In their debut season, they earned a 3rd-place result, but quickly slipped to a last place finish and were relegated.

Today the team is part of the Berlin Kreisliga A Stafel 1 (IX). In addition to its football section, SC has a tennis department.

References

External links
Official team site
 Das deutsche Fußball-Archiv historical German domestic league tables 

Football clubs in Germany
Association football clubs established in 1920
Amateure SC
1920 establishments in Germany